The 2022 Maurice Revello Tournament (officially ), was the 48th edition of the Maurice Revello Tournament, an annual, international, age-restricted football tournament, which was formerly known as the Toulon Tournament. It was held in the department of Bouches-du-Rhône from 29 May to 12 June 2022. The last champions Brazil were not invited to the 2022 tournament.

France won their 13th title beating Venezuela 2–1 in the final.

Participants
Twelve participating teams were announced on 14 April 2022.

AFC
 (2nd participation)
 (15th participation)
 (1st participation)
CAF
 (3rd participation)
 (1st participation)
 (3rd participation)

CONCACAF
 (26th participation)
 (1st participation)
CONMEBOL
 (10th participation)
 (14th participation)
 (1st participation)
UEFA
 (43rd participation)

Squads

Venues
A total of six cities hosted the tournament.

Match officials
The Maurice Revello Tournament and FIFA, on 20 May 2022, announced a collaboration that ensured all matches in the tournament are refereed by women. The referees were chosen from among the referee candidates for the 2023 FIFA Women's World Cup.

The referees were:

Matches rules
Every match consists of two periods of 45 minutes each. In a match, every team has eleven named substitutes and the maximum number of substitutions permitted is five.

In the group stage, in the event of a draw, the two teams face each other in a penalty shoot-out, with a bonus point for the winners. In the knockout stage, if a game tied, extra time would not be played and a penalty shoot-out would be used to determine the winners.

Group stage
The groups were announced on 14 April 2022. The twelve teams were drawn into three groups of four. In the group stage, each group was played on a round-robin basis. The teams were ranked according to points (3 points for a win, 1 point for a draw – extra point for the penalty-shootout winners, and 0 points for a loss). If tied on points, the following criteria would be used to determine the ranking: 1. Goal difference; 2. Goals scored; 3. Fair play points. The group winners and the best runners-up advanced to the semi-finals. The Group stage was played from 29 May to 6 June 2022.

Group A
<onlyinclude><onlyinclude>

Group B
<onlyinclude><onlyinclude>

Group C
<onlyinclude><onlyinclude>

Classification matches
The eliminated teams played another game to determine their final ranking in the competition.

Eleventh place play-off

Ninth place play-off

Seventh place play-off

Fifth place play-off

Knockout stage

Bracket

Semi-finals

Third place play-off

Final

Statistics

Goalscorers

Awards

Individual awards
After the final, the following players were rewarded for their performances during the competition.

Best player:  Telasco Segovia
Second best player:  Sékou Mara
Third best player:  Maghnes Akliouche
Revelation player:  Alejandro Garnacho
Best goalkeeper:  Ryoya Kimura
Topscorer:  Sékou Mara
Best goal of the tournament:  Alejandro Garnacho (playing against France )
Special Price Lucarne Opposée:  Andrés Ferro

Best XI
The best XI team was a squad consisting of the eleven most impressive players at the tournament.

References

External links
Maurice Revello Tournament

2022
2021–22 in French football
2022 in youth association football
May 2022 sports events in France
June 2022 sports events in France